Edwin Griffiths (1884–1950) was an English footballer who played for Stoke.

Career
Griffiths was born in Hanley and played football with the Charterhouse School, Old Carthusians and North Staffs Normads before joining Stoke in 1908. He played seven matches for Stoke during the 1908–09 season and after failing to score he returned to amateur football.

Career statistics

References

English footballers
Stoke City F.C. players
1880s births
1950 deaths
Association football forwards
Sportspeople from Hanley, Staffordshire